Holt Creek may refer to:

Holt Creek (Keya Paha River tributary), a stream in Nebraska and South Dakota
Holt Creek (Wisconsin), a stream in Wisconsin